Aeranthes grandiflora is a species of orchid and is the type species of its genus. It is native to Madagascar and Comoros. It is characterized by long, spindly, naturally hanging inflorescences and relatively large, semi-translucent flowers which open successively over a long period of time; do not cut the inflorescence after the first flower has faded, as these plants rebloom abundantly.

Home culture for this species is among the easiest of any orchid; give them small pots of small-grade bark and moss with medium-warm temperatures (winter nights between 55 and 65 degrees Fahrenheit) and place them under low light of any orientation or even fluorescent lights.

References

grandiflora
Orchids of Madagascar
Flora of the Comoros
Plants described in 1824